Socorro High School may refer to one of two high schools in the United States

Socorro High School (Socorro, New Mexico)
Socorro High School (Socorro, Texas)